Constituent Assembly elections were held in Tunisia on 25 March 1956, five days after independence. The result was a victory for the National Union, an alliance of the Neo Destour party, the Tunisian General Labour Union, the National Union of Tunisian Farmers and the Tunisian Union of Craftsmen and Merchants, which won all 98 seats, with the opposition Communists and independents only winning a combined 1.3% of the vote. Following the election, Habib Bourguiba was appointed Prime Minister of a Neo Destour-dominated government. Voter turnout was 83.6%.

Results

References

Tunisia
Elections in Tunisia
1956 in Tunisia
March 1956 events in Africa